Scandal: How 'Gotcha' Politics Is Destroying America is a 2006 book by Lanny Davis, a lawyer who was special counsel to Bill Clinton, an appointee under George W. Bush, and advisor to Hillary Clinton during her then-upcoming 2008 campaign (and later her 2016 campaign).  The theme of the book is "that both [major political] parties [in the United States] have to learn to have civil debate, the[n] solve people's problem[s]," by working together in a bipartisan fashion.  Moreover, Davis predicts that centrist 'purple' politicians could build a winning bipartisan coalition in that manner, in particular by winning over 'angry' independent voters fed up with scandal-mongering and incivility.

Plot
Davis decries partisan-driven scandal-oriented politics specifically, and political polarization generally.

Partisan scandal-mongering was not a new phenomenon in 2007.  Davis mentions various historical scandals, such as: 
 "the sexual scandals of Alexander Hamilton and Thomas Jefferson, each of whom attempted to use them to hurt the other politically" in the early 1800s
 Credit Mobilier in 1872
 the illegitimate child of Grover Cleveland ("information about which was to be leaked during his first presidential campaign in 1884" according to Davis)
 sexual relationship between Warren Harding and Nan Britton
Davis believes it to be a particularly important phenomena in the 1990s and beyond, however, saying that "over two centuries, there is a pattern of politicians using the media, and vice versa, in attempts to bring down political adversaries... Today's version of the post-Watergate scandal culture is different, however, in one significant and unprecedented way:  its far greater destructive power." [emphasis in original]

In particular, the book contends several post-Watergate trends occurred in the journalism profession, the legal profession, and amongst elected politicians (to include the staffers and the major political parties and the partisan voter-base which helps get those politicians elected and re-elected), as well as the wider cultural moires of the general public: 
 changes in the unwritten rules of investigative journalism which made publishing vague unproven allegations permissible, including especially no-holds-barred scandals related to purported corruption or alleged sexual behavior  
 increasing competitive pressures of the 24-hour news cycle (and the internet), especially on fact-checking procedures
 the relatively new use and misuse of independent counsels by politicians in Congress, in addition to Congressional hearings
 increasing overuse of anonymous sources by the news media
 the intentional leaking of damaging material for partisan reasons by politicians and their staffers
 increasing willingness of the news media to publish material which implies guilt when all the facts are not yet known 
 Davis writes that "perhaps most damning, Watergate showed reporters that bringing down a high-profile politician might lead to financial and professional gain, even if at the end of the day it results in no final determination or conviction of wrongdoing"
 increasingly non-competitive, gerrymandered, effectively one-party Congressional districts (which Davis calls "a major reason for the hyper-partisanship in Congress by both parties") 
 increasing willingness of the voting public (especially the portion that participates in major-party political primaries and caucuses) to reward negativity 
 increasing appetite among the partisan public for corruption scandals, sex scandals, and similar, plus decreasing demand such scandals actually be true 
 increasing cynicism about the general public on the motives of politicians, journalists, and lawyers

The outcome of these broad trends is a type of never-ending arms race between the partisan subgroups found within both of the two major parties, with both sides using the media and the legal system to further their aims, whilst the news media and the lawyers used the scandals of both parties to make massive profits: 

 Richard Nixon, 1974 (resigns to avoid impeachment)
 Raymond Donovan, 1977
 Independent Cousel Statute, 1978
 Robert Bork, 1986/1987 (see 'Borked up') 
 Gary Hart, 1987
 Iran-Contra, 1987-1992 (Davis writes, "Lawrence Walsh made the reckless decision to re-indict former Defense Secretary Caspar Weinberger on the Friday before the 1992 presidential election, gratuitously and unnecessarily including in the indictment a reference to President (George H. W.) Bush... In retrospect it now seems clear that this was the ultimate criminalization of politics that had so outraged President Bush and leading Republicans at the time.  No leading Democrat, and certainly no Clinton supporters cheering that final weekend at this very damaging blow to President Bush's reelection chances, complained publicly.  (I [author Lanny Davis] certainly didn't!)..." but goes on to argue that this was a mistake in the long run.) 
 Clarence Thomas, 1991
 Jim Wright, 1989
 Bill Clinton, 1995-1997 (Whitewater, Vincent Foster, Travelgate, fundraising practices, FBI files, Paula Jones, etc.) 
 Newt Gingrich, 1997 (which Davis describes as part of the "...inevitable gotcha-cycle boomerang effect...")
 Bill Clinton, 1998-2000 ("...then there was the Monica incident -- after which all previous rules of media restraint rushed out the window" writes Davis, was special counsel to Clinton during part of the 1990s)
 Robert Livingston, 1999
 George W. Bush, 2002-2004 (Davis says, Much of the Democratic attacks on President Bush's decision to go to war in Iraq also has the unfortunate aroma of 'gotcha' politics.  Instead of focusing on objective facts showing that President Bush and his advisers got it 'wrong' -- such as selective use and misuses of intelligence on weapons of mass destruction ... too many left-wing bloggers and Bush-bashing Democratic partisans have tried to prove that President Bush and senior administration officials 'lied'.") 
 I. Lewis 'Scooter' Libby, 2005
 Jack Abramoff, 2005 (pleads guilty)
 Duke Cunningham, 2005 (pleads guilty)
 Tom DeLay, 2005/2006

In addition to listing specific incidents where the scandal-culture has been prominent, Davis wrote that the scandal-culture is harmful even when no high-profile incident is ongoing:  "Meanwhile, the rantings on both the left and right of the shouters, food fighters, and hate-mongers on talk radio, cable television shows, and, in recent years, countless blogs go on, seemingly caring little about actual facts and truth before broadcasting and blogging accusations -- all of which add more reckless negative energy and fuel to the scandal machine and gotcha politics."

Davis believed that the key to breaking the back-and-forth cycle of 'gotcha' politics between the two major parties was a return to civility amongst politicians, as the first step on a path towards the return of respect for due process, and also for truth.
 
Davis backed Hillary Clinton in the 2008 election, shortly after the book was published.  Davis published a column for several years called Purple Nation which expounded on aspects of his thesis that there was a winning coalition of centrists and independents to be found, in between the extremes of partisan politics.

Reception 

According to the author, the book received praise from Democratic Senator Evan Bayh and Joe Lieberman, Democratic Leadership Council CEO Al From, law professor Alan M. Dershowitz, and conservative commentator Michael Medved.

See also
 Media bias in the United States and yellow journalism 
 Trial by media and guilt by association 
 Congressional hearings and Independent Counsels
 Leak (political) and lie of omission
 Vast right-wing conspiracy and lamestream media
 Whispering campaign and character assassination
 Sensationalism (especially by the news media) and junk food news
 Clinton '08 and Clinton '16

References  
 2006 interview about the book -- https://www.npr.org/2006/11/25/6537426/the-2006-election-end-of-gotcha-politics   
 2010 Master's thesis (pages 1, 7, 20, 23, 27, 29, etc.) -- https://theses.lib.vt.edu/theses/available/etd-05192010-151418/unrestricted/Marrs_RA_T_2010.pdf    
 https://www.washingtonian.com/2006/10/01/scandal-how-gotcha-politics-is-destroying-america-lanny-davis/  
 http://www.huffingtonpost.com/dave-johnson/auto-bailout-controversy_b_9408780.html   
 https://www.nytimes.com/2015/05/10/magazine/crying-gotcha.html   
 http://www.adweek.com/prnewser/sex-bombs-lanny-davis-responds-to-prnewser/1410

External links 
 Author's homepage for the book -- http://www.lannyjdavis.com/books
 Publisher's homepage for the book -- http://us.macmillan.com/scandal/lannydavis
 Preview of the 2007 book, as a 2015 ebook -- https://books.google.com/books?isbn=1466892803 
 2008 quote by the author about 'gotcha'-style campaign advertisements by the Obama campaign -- https://www.motherjones.com/mojo/2008/08/lanny-davis-president-youre-not-helping-caucus
 2009 opinion piece by the author on purple centrist Democratic party members -- http://www.washingtontimes.com/news/2009/mar/30/newark-mayor-cory-bookers-purple-leadership/
 2010 newsletter by the author on purple international leaders -- https://wikileaks.org/clinton-emails/Clinton_Email_August_Release/C05775652.pdf
 2010 opinion piece by the author urging far-left Democrats to be willing to compromise with centrist Republicans -- https://www.wsj.com/articles/SB10001424052748703837004575013221708478134
 2014 opinion piece by the author on the extremes of the political spectrum -- http://www.foxnews.com/opinion/2014/02/14/what-is-liberal-what-is-conservative.html 
 2015 opinion piece by the author on 'gotcha' questions by the media during presidential debates -- http://thehill.com/opinion/lanny-davis/259177-lanny-davis-voters-deserve-real-debates-not-gotcha-questions

2006 non-fiction books
American political books